Nasir Mehmood is a Pakistani politician who had been a member of the Provincial Assembly of the Punjab from October 2018 till January 2023.

Political career
Nasir Mehmood was elected to the Provincial Assembly of Punjab from the constituency PP-27 in 2018 Pakistani by-elections on the ticket of Pakistan Muslim League (N). He defeated Shah Nawaz Raja of Pakistan Tehreek-e-Insaf. This constituency was vacated by federal information minister Fawad Chaudhry.

References

Living people
Pakistan Muslim League (N) politicians
Politicians from Punjab, Pakistan
Year of birth missing (living people)

Lilla, Jhelum
People from Pind Dadan Khan Tehsil
People from Pind Dadan Khan
People from Jhelum District
Politicians from Jhelum